For the town  in Atsimo-Andrefana Region in Madagascar, see Manombo Sud

Manombo is a village of the commune of Nosifeno in the district of Midongy-Atsimo in the region of Atsimo-Atsinanana in south-eastern Madagascar.

See also
Manombo Special Reserve

Populated places in Atsimo-Atsinanana